Rachel Thomas may refer to:

 Rachel Thomas (actress) (1905–1995), Welsh character actress
 Rachel Thomas (skydiver) (born 1955), first Indian woman to skydive over the North Pole
 Rachel Thomas (academic), American computer scientist